Elmir Valiyev (b. 6 June 1989, Yevlakh, Yevlakh Region, Azerbaijan) is a Head of the Administrative Legislation Sector of the National Assembly of Azerbaijan, of Ganja European Youth Capital 2016 Public Union, of the Supervisory Board of Kapaz Professional Football Club.

Life and Political career
Elmir Valiyev was born on June 6, 1989, in Yevlakh. He attended school N5 in Yevlakh from 1995 till 1999.

From 1999 till 2005 he continued his education at school N9 and graduated from the same school with a diploma.

In 2005, he entered the Baku State University of International Law and International Relations. He received a diploma in law.

From 2009 till 2010 he was serving in the military of the Ministry of Defence of the Azerbaijan Republic.

In 2010 he continued his education at BSU to receive extra specializations.

On February 15, 2013, he graduated from the BSU and received his diploma in law.

In 2014, he entered to BSU to earn the master's degree.

From 2010, he worked as an expert on the State Building and Law Policy Committee. From 2012, he worked as a consultant in the Administrative and Military Legislation Division of the Azerbaijan Parliament. From 2015, he worked as a Senior Consultant of the same department.

He was named Chairman of Ganja European Youth Capital 2016 Public Union in February 2014.

He has also been the Chairman of the Supervisory Board of Kapaz Professional Football Club since May 2015.

He was elected as Head of sector of the Milli Mejlis of the Azerbaijan Republic.
in February 2017.

He is a member of the New Azerbaijan Party.

See also
Son of Elmar Valiyev
Nephew of Khanlar Valiyev

References

Gallery

External links
 http://www.ganja2016.eu
 http://meclis.gov.az

1989 births
Living people
Azerbaijani politicians
Baku State University alumni
People from Yevlakh District